Jamali may refer to:

Places
Jamali, Shiraz, a village in Fars Province, Iran
Jamali, South Khorasan, a village in South Khorasan Province, Iran
Jamali, North Karelia, a village in North Karelia Province, Finland

Other uses
Jamali (tribe), a Baloch tribe of Pakistan
Jamali (band), a South African female musical group
Jamali (artist), a New York-based artist
Jamali (given name)
Jamali (surname)

See also
Dera Murad Jamali, a city in Pakistan
Jamali Colony, a neighbourhood of Gulshan Town in Karachi, Pakistan
Jamali Noorpur, a Union Council of Khushab District in Pakistan